WUPG (formerly WUPZ) (96.7 FM) is a radio station licensed to Republic, Michigan. The station is currently owned by Armada Media Corporation, through licensee AMC Partners Escanaba, LLC, and was granted its license on April 17, 2008. The station signed on in July 2008 with a Variety Hits format. On March 4, 2014, changed formats to Classic Country branded as "Yooper Country 96.7". In 2017, the station changed their brand to "The Maverick", using the same brand as sister stations WTIQ and WGMV. Part if the UP's Radio Results Network.

Sources
Michiguide.com - WUPG History

External links
Maverick 96 Facebook

UPG